Regina Tadevosi Ghazaryan (April 17, 1915 in Yerevan – November 6, 1999 in Yerevan) was an Armenian painter and public figure. Known as a friend and benefactor of Yeghishe Charents, she is credited with saving many of the poet's manuscripts during the regime of Joseph Stalin.

Biography
Regina Ghazaryan was born in a family of an Armenian genocide survivor from Van and a noble mother from Yerevan (Khorasanyans). She met the poet Yeghishe Charents in 1930. At the age of fifteen, Ghazaryan, an orphan, had "in some sort been adopted by Charents as both an intimate friend and a witness to his solitary hours".

In 1937, from the prison cell Charents had secretly informed his wife Izabella that she should trust all of his writings only to a family friend, artist Regina Ghazaryan and she will save them from being destroyed. After Charents's death Regina Ghazaryan hid and preserved many of his manuscripts (7000 lines in total including "Requiem to Komitas", "The Nameless", "Songs of Autumn" and "Navzike") in the garden. As a military pilot she participated in World War II. She finished Yerevan Fine Arts Institute in 1951.

On 11 March 1954, Anastas Mikoyan called for the rehabilitation of Charents in a speech in Yerevan. The speech inspired Ghazaryan to remove Charents's manuscripts from hiding. She granted them to the Charents Museum of Literature and Arts.

In 2009 a memorial plaque was inaugurated on the house at Baghramyan St. 33a, Yerevan where Regina Ghazaryan lived and worked from 1961 to 1999.

Ghazaryan's paintings are exhibited in various museums of Armenia, including the National Gallery of Armenia. She was a member of the Painters' Union of Armenia.

Awards
 Honorary citizen of Yerevan (1995)
 Renowned painter of Armenia (1985)

Works
 Charents (1966)
 Aghavnadzor (1965)
 Komitas (1969)
 Aspetakan (1975)
 Paruyr Sevak
 Khaghagh tiezerk

Personal exhibitions
 Yerevan (1967, 1987, 1988)
 Gyumri (1967)
 Ejmiatsin (1967)

Books
 Charentsyan Nshkharner by Regina Ghazaryan (1998)

Publications
 Regina Ghazaryan, "Reminiscences about Charents" [Husher Charentsi masin], Garun. Erevan, #1. 1987, pp. 67–75

References

External links
 Memorial plaque to Regina Ghazaryan, who saved Charents' manuscripts, inaugurated in Yerevan
 Биография
 Вечно с Чаренцом // Республика Армения, 2009
 AZG Armenian Daily - WAP-version

1915 births
1999 deaths
Artists from Yerevan
Armenian women artists
20th-century Armenian painters
20th-century Armenian women artists